Life and Death in Shanghai is an autobiography published in November 1987 by Yao Nien-Yuan under the pen name Nien Cheng.  Written in exile in the United States, it tells the story of Cheng's arrest during the first days of the Cultural Revolution, her more than six years' confinement, release, persecution, efforts to leave China, and early life in exile.

Cheng was arrested in late 1966 after the Red Guards looted her home.  During her confinement, she was pressured to make a false confession that she was a spy for "the imperialists" because for many years after the death of her husband she had continued to work as a senior partner for Shell in Shanghai.  Cheng refused to provide a false confession, and was tortured as a result.

She was eventually paroled under the pretense that her attitude had shown improvement.  However, Cheng resisted leaving the detention house without receiving acknowledgment from her captors that she had been unjustly treated.

When released from jail in 1973, Cheng found that her daughter Meiping, who had been studying to become a film actress, had been murdered by the Red Guards, although the official position was that she had committed suicide. Cheng conducted a discreet investigation and found that this scenario was impossible. The alleged killer of Meiping, a rebel worker named Hu Yongnian, was arrested and given a suspended death sentence by Shanghai authorities in 1980, but he was eventually paroled in 1995.

After being relocated from her spacious home to a mere two bedrooms on the second floor of a two-story building, Cheng continued her life under constant surveillance, including spying by the family on the first floor.

She lived in China until 1980, when the political climate warmed enough for her to apply for a visa to the United States to visit family. She never returned, first emigrating to Canada, and later to Washington, D.C., where she wrote the autobiography.

The autobiography goes into great detail about her persecution, confinement and torture, so much so that the author had to put the manuscript away many times as she wrote it because the memories were so troubling.

Further reading

"A prisoner of the thought police", New York Times, May 31, 1987.
Life and Death in Shanghai, Time magazine, February 5, 2007.
Review, Los Angeles Times, June 19, 1988.
Rosen, Stanley. "Book Reviews: Life and Death in Shanghai / Born Red." The Journal of Asian Studies. May 1988. Volume 47, Issue 2. p. 339-341.

References

1987 non-fiction books
Books about Shanghai
Books about the Cultural Revolution
Autobiographies